Lasioglossum petrellum is a species of sweat bee in the family Halictidae.

References

Further reading

 

petrellum
Insects described in 1903